Elementary may refer to:

Arts, entertainment, and media

Music
 Elementary (Cindy Morgan album), 2001
 Elementary (The End album), 2007
 Elementary, a Melvin "Wah-Wah Watson" Ragin album, 1977

Other uses in arts, entertainment, and media
 Elementary (TV series), a 2012 American drama television series
 "Elementary, my dear Watson", a catchphrase of Sherlock Holmes

Education
 Elementary and Secondary Education Act, US
 Elementary education, or primary education, the first years of formal, structured education
 Elementary Education Act 1870, England and Wales
 Elementary school, a school providing elementary or primary education

Science and technology
 ELEMENTARY, a class of objects in computational complexity theory
 Elementary, a widget set based on the Enlightenment Foundation Libraries
 Elementary abelian group, an abelian group in which every nontrivial element is of prime order
 Elementary algebra
 Elementary arithmetic
 Elementary charge, e, of a single electron
 Elementary definition, in mathematical logic
 elementary OS, a Linux distribution
 Elementary particle, in particle physics
 Elementary proof

See also
 Element (disambiguation)
 Elemental (disambiguation)